Kim Kwang-chol is a politician from the Democratic People's Republic of Korea (North Korea). He has served as Minister of Posts and Telecommunications in the Cabinet of North Korea since 2015 and is a candidate for the Political Bureau of the Central Committee of the Workers' Party of Korea. He was the deputy to the 13th convocation of the Supreme People's Assembly.

Biography
Prior to being Minister of Posts and Telecommunications he worked as director of the Pyongyang People's Committee Telephone Bureau, Taecheon Power Plant Director, Pyongyang Telephone Office Director, and Chesinseong Gaecheon City Post Office. In 2015, he was appointed as the Minister of Posts and replaced Sim Chol-ho. In May 2016, the 7th Congress of the Workers' Party of Korea was elected as a candidate for the Central Committee of the Workers' Party of Korea.

References

Members of the Supreme People's Assembly
Government ministers of North Korea
Year of birth missing (living people)
Living people
Members of the 8th Central Committee of the Workers' Party of Korea